Bruno Deschênes (born 22 May 1963) is a Canadian fencer. He competed in the team sabre event at the 1988 Summer Olympics.

References

External links
 

1963 births
Living people
Canadian male fencers
Olympic fencers of Canada
Fencers at the 1988 Summer Olympics
Fencers from Montreal
Pan American Games medalists in fencing
Pan American Games bronze medalists for Canada
Fencers at the 1991 Pan American Games